Moisés Avilés (12 February 1909 – 19 April 1972) was a Chilean footballer. He played in four matches for the Chile national football team from 1935 to 1937. He was also part of Chile's squad for the 1935 South American Championship.

References

External links
 

1909 births
1972 deaths
Chilean footballers
Chile international footballers
Place of birth missing
Association football forwards
Audax Italiano footballers